Novi is a city in Oakland County in the U.S. state of Michigan. As of the 2020 census, the population was 66,243, an increase of 20% from the 2010 census.

The city is located within the boundaries of the survey township of Novi Township, which now also includes portions of the cities of Northville and Walled Lake. The remaining unincorporated township is only a tiny fraction of  surrounded by the city.

History

Novi was organized as a township in 1832, on land  taken from Farmington Township. The name Novi was offered by resident Dr. J. C. Emery, at the suggestion of his wife. Residents were reportedly looking for a shorter name than Farmington.

A local account has said that it was named after the 6th toll gate (No. VI) on the Grand River Road. But the township was named in 1832 and the toll road was not constructed until the 1850s. Another account said that it was the sixth stagecoach stop outside  Detroit. Similarly, the township was said to be stop six (or VI) on the railroad, but the Holly, Wayne & Monroe Railway (now CSX Transportation) was not constructed through the township until 1870–71, almost 40 years after the organization and naming of the township.

Novi was incorporated as a city in 1969 after the approval of a city charter on February 18, 1969 by Village of Novi voters. Charter approval followed an election on May 20, 1968 in which voters approved the incorporation of the city: the vote was 694 in favor and 283 votes against. The charter became effective on February 24, 1969. There had been several previous attempts by organizers to incorporate as a city. The city was incorporated along the boundaries of the existing Village of Novi, and grew quickly in the latter half of the 20th century as second- and third-stage waves of white flight from the City of Detroit and older suburbs resulted in more extensive urban sprawl in the region.

Historic sites
The historic Township Hall was originally located on Novi Road, south of Grand River. It was moved to the Novi Library property in the 1980s. It was recently relocated again onto the property that was the site of the Jacob and Rebecca Fuerst Farmstead.
Tollgate Farm is a 160-acre (650,000 m2) farmstead and educational center.
The Colonel Samuel White Homestead site  is identified by a Michigan Historical Marker.
A portion of the original Novi Depot, was constructed in 1871 for the Holly, Wayne and Monroe Railroad (now absorbed by CSX Transportation).
The Jacob and Rebecca Fuerst Farmstead was a historic site listed on the National Register of Historic Places. The City of Novi demolished the Fuerst Farmstead in order to develop the site for other historic uses. The north barn was destroyed on July 16, 2008. The farm house was demolished in August 2008.  The south and east barns were dismantled and removed from the site. None of the original buildings of the Farmstead was preserved on the site. But the historic Township Hall was relocated to this site.

Geography

The city is located on Walled Lake which lies mainly within Novi and is the largest lake in the city. It also serves as the headwaters of the Middle Branch of the Rouge River. Shawood Lake is southwest of Walled Lake. Several smaller lakes within the city were created by gravel pit mining or as stormwater retention areas. Most of the city lies within the Rouge River watershed. Some areas on the north and west side of the city are part of the Huron River watershed.

Three major freeways converge in Novi. The city's location provides direct access to several major freeways including I-96, I-696, I-275, and M-5.

Economy

Novi continues to be one of the fastest-growing cities in Michigan. The construction of Twelve Oaks Mall in 1977 made the city a major shopping destination in the Detroit metropolitan area and is often credited with ushering in an era of growth that lasted for 40 years (although, in fact, the community had been growing rapidly since the 1950s). This growth has led to substantial increases in the city's population, as well as commercial and industrial developments in the city. Novi was ranked #48 on Money magazine's list of the Top 100 Best Places to Live in 2008. As of January 2009 Novi has over 1,600 businesses.

Novi's economy includes international corporations with local and regional offices as well as owner-operated businesses serving the local area. While Novi is recognized for its large concentration of retail businesses clustered at the Novi Road and I-96 interchange, there are several large retail centers in the city as well as many individual retail businesses. Novi has car dealerships along Haggerty Road and Grand River Avenue. The city's industrial and office parks are home to companies in high tech research and development, health care, transportation and logistics, manufacturing and domestic and foreign automotive-related suppliers. Energy-related companies are one of the fastest-growing sectors in the city. These companies include the headquarters for ITC Transmission, Novi Energy and offices of Patrick Energy Services.

The business community in Novi is represented by the Novi Chamber of Commerce.

Kroger operates its Michigan regional offices at 40399 Grand River Avenue in Novi. The Japan Auto Parts Industries Association, North America has its offices in Novi. Toyota Boshoku America opened in a Novi office in 2002, with 10 employees. As of April 2013 the company has two office buildings in Novi with 210 total employees, with about 30 of them being Japanese assignees. Ted Schafer, the vice president of the Technical Center, said that Novi was selected due to the community and schools friendly to Japanese people, and the proximity to General Motors offices, Toyota offices, and Detroit Metropolitan Wayne County Airport. In December 2009 American Mitsuba Corp. moved to Novi, and as of April 2013 the office employs 32 people, and increase from when it was first established. The senior vice president, David Martin Stevens, said that the location was chosen due to the quality of the office building.

Novi ranks among the top Oakland County communities for research, technology and service companies. To manage growth and to continue to attract commerce with its accessible location, Novi partners with local, state and federal agencies to enhance infrastructure. Novi has a Neighborhoods and Business Relations Group to attract and retain businesses and streamlined many of its planning and approvals processes to encourage new business and development, as well as redevelopment.  The enhancements speed the process, allowing businesses to move ahead with plans for relocation or expansion. Novi has been able to attract several smaller, innovative international firms that have been able to incubate and expand into a larger facility, such as Howa USA Holdings, a Japanese auto supplier with a new research and development center in Novi specializing in interior components for vehicles.

Ryder System Inc. constructed a new regional headquarters, representing a $22 million investment in the community.  ITC Transmission Company, the nation's largest independent electrical transmission company, made Novi its national headquarters.  In 2008, St. John Providence Park opened a 200-bed hospital on a  total, health campus.  In addition to the full-service hospital, the campus provides an array of services in a beautiful wooded setting, complete with walking and cycling paths and  devoted to health-related retail establishments.

Over the last few years, Novi has focused its economic development efforts on the telematics and car connectivity industries. Within the telematics industry, more than 5,000 firms employ approximately 70,000 people in Oakland County, many of them employed in Novi.  Those firms in Novi include Cooper-Standard Automotive, NXP, Elektrobit, and Harman/Becker Automotive. Tognum, based in Germany, is scheduled to relocate its headquarters to Novi on Haggerty Road, between 13 and 14 Mile Roads.

Around 2008 the median house price was in the upper $260,000s.

Top employers

According to the City's 2019 Comprehensive Annual Financial Report, the top public and private sector employers in the city are:

Health care
Novi is home to some of the region's largest health care systems. St. John Providence Health System operates the Providence Park Hospital off of Interstate 96 and Beck Road. It has a capacity for fewer than 400 patients, and it is located on a  site that also includes medical office building and neuroscience institute, a hotel with 100 rooms, and an orthopedic center that houses an ambulatory surgical center. Construction on the hospital began in 2005 and lasted for three years. The total cost was about $220 million. The architecture firm that designed the hospital was NBBJ and the engineering firm was Korda. The hospital design includes a six-story atrium that allows natural sunlight. It opened in September 2008.

Henry Ford Health System operates the Henry Ford Medical Center - Columbus. It is the system's largest facility in Oakland County.  Services at the location include primary care, behavioral health services, cancer treatment, diabetes care, endoscopy, infusion services, lymphedema services, MOHs surgery, MRIs, and rehabilitation services and travel clinic.
Botsford has two speciality facilities in Novi.

Parks and recreation
Most of the farmland and open spaces present in the mid-20th century have been developed. The exceptions include the Tollgate Farm located at the northwest corner of the intersection of Twelve Mile and Meadowbrook Roads. This farmstead is owned by the Americana Foundation and is currently leased and operated by Michigan State University as an agricultural extension. Lakeshore Park is another prominent natural area. The park is located between Walled Lake and Twelve Mile Road, west of Novi Road. While portions of the park were turned over to a developer to settle a lawsuit, it remains one of the largest municipal parks in southeast Michigan. Ella Mae Power Park, located behind the Novi Civic Center, hosts softball and baseball games and tournaments.

In 2004, the City of Novi negotiated for the donation of several parcels of parkland on the west side of the city. These properties, along with several adjoining parcels owned by the city, preserve  of environmentally sensitive areas in the Huron River watershed. In 2005, the City of Novi was awarded a Michigan Natural Resources Trust Fund (MNRTF) grant to acquire  two areas of environmentally sensitive property in southeast Novi within the Rouge River watershed. The properties were acquired in 2009. In 2007, the City was awarded a second MNRTF grant to acquire  of natural area in southwest Novi within the headwaters of the Huron River watershed. The property was acquired in 2010. In 2010, the City was awarded a third MNRTF grant to develop the city-owned property on the south end of Walled Lake, once the site of the Walled Lake Casino and Amusement Park, into a public park. That property is now the Pavilion Shore Park

Each year in October, the Japan Festival is held in the city. It is the largest Japan festival in the state.

Government

Current City Council members

Novi operates under the council-manager system of government with an appointed city manager and elected city council. The city manager oversees the day-to-day operations of the city, manages staff operations, recommends the annual budget and makes policy recommendations to the council. The city council consists of the mayor, elected to a two-year term, and six at-large council members elected to four-year terms.  The mayor is the presiding officer of the council with the same voting powers as the other council members. The mayor also has ceremonial duties.  The council is responsible for hiring the city manager. The city council approves the city budget and sets city policies and ordinances. The City of Novi is represented in the 21st District of the Michigan House of Representatives by State Representative Kelly Breen.

The interim City Manager is Victor Cardenas. The city has 249 full-time employees and a total budget of $63.1 million.  The Novi Civic Center is located at 45175 West Ten Mile Road between Novi and Taft Roads.

The first city charter was adopted by the voters in 1969. The last major charter revision was in 1977.

The Novi Public Library opened a new  library west of the previous library in June 2010. The old library was demolished to provide a parking area for the new library.

The Novi Fire Department was formed in 1929 to serve Novi Township. The Novi Police Department was formed in 1954 to serve Novi Township. Prior to 1954, Novi contracted with the Oakland County Sheriff's Office for police protection.

Demographics

2010 census
As of the census of 2010, there were 55,224 people, 22,258 households, and 14,599 families residing in the city. The racial makeup of the city was 73.0% White, 8.1% African American, 0.2% Native American, 15.9% Asian, 0.7% from other races, and 2.1% from two or more races. Hispanic or Latino people of any race were 3.0% of the population.

There were 22,258 households, of which 35.2% had children under the age of 18 living with them, 54.1% were married couples living together, 8.6% had a female householder with no husband present, 2.9% had a male householder with no wife present, and 34.4% were non-families. 29.5% of all households were made up of individuals, and 9.9% had someone living alone who was 65 years of age or older. The average household size was 2.46 and the average family size was 3.11.

The median age in the city was 39.1 years. 25.5% of residents were under the age of 18; 6.6% were between the ages of 18 and 24; 28% were from 25 to 44; 28.6% were from 45 to 64; and 11.3% were 65 years of age or older. The gender makeup of the city was 48.4% male and 51.6% female.

2000 census
In 2000, there were 18,726 households, out of which 36.3% had children under the age of 18 living with them, 56.2% were married couples living together, 7.1% had a female householder with no husband present, and 34.2% were non-families. 28.1% of all households were made up of individuals, and 5.9% had someone living alone who was 65 years of age or older.  The average household size was 2.52 and the average family size was 3.17.

In the city in 2000, the population was spread out, with 27.6% under the age of 18, 6.7% from 18 to 24, 35.7% from 25 to 44, 21.9% from 45 to 64, and 8.1% who were 65 years of age or older. The median age was 35 years. For every 100 females, there were 96.9 males. For every 100 females age 18 and over, there were 93.4 males.

The median income for a household in the city in 2000 was $71,918, and the median income for a family was $91,369 (These figures had risen to $78,151 and $101,286 respectively according to a 2007 estimate). Males had a median income of $65,590 versus $38,432 for females. The per capita income for the city was $35,992.  About 1.6% of families and 2.2% of the population were below the poverty line, including 2.4% of those under age 18 and 2.7% of those age 65 or over.

Japanese population

As of 2011, 15.9% of its residents were Asian, and Novi had 2,438 Japanese residents, giving it the largest Japanese population of any Michigan municipality. By 2011 the Japanese population experienced an increase of 53% from 2003, when the city had 1,417 Japanese residents. The economic director of the City of Novi, Ara Topouzian, said "We've been told often by the consulate-general's office or other Japanese officials that they refer to Novi as Little Tokyo because we've been very warm and welcoming and accommodating." Many Japanese in Novi are in the United States on temporary visas which last for three to five years. According to Dr. Andrew Vosburgh of the St. John Providence Health System, many Japanese in Novi work in development, engineering, and research. Their workplaces are located in and around several cities including Novi, Ann Arbor, and Springfield Township. As of April 2013 there are 2,666 Japanese nationals who live in Novi.

The Novi Public Library has Japanese content in the adult and children's sections. The Novi Community School District has enrollment information and other documents available in Japanese. The websites of the City of Novi, the Novi Public Library, and St. John Providence Park Hospital have Japanese welcome messages. The Novi Kroger and the Staybridge Suites extended stay hotel cater to Japanese customers. The hotel stated in 2011 that Japanese make up 30% of its customers, and had increased in a two-year span ending in 2011. The city also has Japanese cultural activities and cultural activities offered in Japanese, including horseback riding lessons conducted in the Japanese language and a Japanese movie night. The hospital offers cultural awareness training for employees, documents translated in Japanese, Japanese translators, and yoga classes conducted in Japanese.

In the 1990s several Japanese automobile firms had opened offices along M-14. Nissan Motor Co. opened its Farmington Hills office in November 1991. In addition, Toyota established a technical center in Ann Arbor. Novi had gained several Japanese restaurants by the mid-1990s. In summer 2011, the Japanese School of Detroit moved to Novi from Birmingham.

Indian/South Asian population

The 2008 CNN/Money "Best Places to Live" stated that the city had a significant Asian Indian population. According to the 2000 U.S. Census there were 1,278 ethnic Asian Indians in Novi.

The  Sri Venkateswara Temple and Cultural Center (SVTCC), built for $10 million, opened in 2013. It is the first Michigan Hindu temple to be named after a southern Indian deity. It had a temporary location for five years before it opened its permanent facility. As of 2013 the temple has a client base of about 3,000 people. The community operating the temple mostly comes from the Indians who speak Telugu. Many of them originate from Telangana and  Andhra Pradesh.

Education

Primary and secondary schools

Novi includes all or part of four public school districts including Novi Community Schools, Northville Public Schools, South Lyon Community Schools, and Walled Lake Consolidated School District. All Novi Community Schools schools, including six elementary schools, a middle school, and a high school, are in the city limits. The Hickory Woods and Meadowbrook elementary schools from Walled Lake district are in the city limits.  Thornton Creek Elementary from Northville schools is in the city limits.

All five Novi schools elementary schools and Novi Middle School serve the Novi Community Schools portion. Of the South Lyon portion, Dolsen and Hardy Elementary Schools, and Centennial Middle School serve the portion. Of the Walled Lake portion, Hickory Woods and Meadowbrook elementaries, and James R. Geisler Middle School serve that portion. Schools serving the Northville section include Amerman, Moraine, and Thornton Creek elementary schools, and Hillside Middle School.

Public high schools serving Novi include:
 Novi High School (Novi Community Schools) - within the city limits
 Northville High School (Northville Schools)
 South Lyon East High School
 Walled Lake Western High School (Walled Lake Schools)

Private schools include:
Detroit Catholic Central High School
Novi Christian Academy

The Catholic K-8 school Our Lady of Victory School in Northville belongs to the Our Lady of Victory Parish, which designated the two Novi Catholic churches (Holy Family and Saint James) as "collaboration partner parishes". St. William Church, which includes sections of Novi in its service area, also operates a Catholic K-8 school, St. William Catholic School, in Walled Lake. The Catholic schools belong to the Roman Catholic Archdiocese of Detroit.

Public libraries
The Charles and Myrtle Walker Novi Public Library serves Novi. It first opened in 1960 in a former bank building. An addition, installed in 1964, made the library two times its original size. In 1975, the groundbreaking ceremonies for a  new library facility were held, and the library opened in 1976. The project to construct the "Dorothy Flattery Wing", the eastern wing, began in 1988. The wing was dedicated on April 22, 1989. The current facility had its groundbreaking in 2008, opening to the public on June 1, 2010.

Miscellaneous education
The Japanese School of Detroit (JSD), a supplementary Japanese school, offers Saturday Japanese classes. It moved to Novi from Birmingham in the summer of 2011.

The Sundai Michigan International Academy (駿台ミシガン国際学院 Sundai Mishigan Kokusai Gakuin), affiliated with the Sundai Center for International Education (駿台国際教育センター Sundai Kokusai Kyōiku Sentā, see 駿台予備学校), is located in Novi. The school's purpose is to prepare Japanese children who have lived in the United States for a long time for a return to Japan, and to assist newly arrived Japanese children who have no fluency of English.

Religion
The Roman Catholic Archdiocese of Detroit operates Catholic churches in Novi:
 Holy Family Church - The congregation opened in September 1974. People initially used Orchard Hills School as a worship site. The current name of the parish was established on November 12 of that year, and the permanent building opened on November 5, 1977.
 Saint James Church - Opened in 1989 and occupied its current facility in fall 1993. The Parish/Family Life Center opened in 2006.
St. William Catholic Church in Walled Lake includes a portion of Novi in its service area.

Sri Venkateswara Temple and Cultural Center (SVTCC) is an area Hindu temple.

Notable people
Novi is home to six Swedish Detroit Red Wings. Mike Babcock, the former coach of the team, called Novi "Little Sweden" due to the concentration of Swedish Red Wings players.

 Jessica Chobot (1977-), on-camera host of IGN Strategize, Weekly Wood, and Nerdist News
 Madison Chock (1992-),  ice dancer, 2014 Olympian, 2013 and 2014 U.S. silver medalist, and 2009 World Junior Champion
 Bryan Dechart (1987-), actor and Twitch streamer
 Craig DeRoche (1970-), former speaker of the House, State of Michigan
 Jonathan Ericsson (1984-), defenseman, Detroit Red Wings
 Johan Franzén (1979-), center, Detroit Red Wings
 Dustin Gazley - winger, Hershey Bears
 Dr. Sanjay Gupta (1969-), chief medical correspondent for CNN, graduate of Novi High School
 Ernie Harwell (1918–2010), MLB radio announcer
 Tomas Holmström (1973-), winger, Detroit Red Wings
 Jumpsteady (1970-), rapper signed to Psychopathic Records, born Robert Bruce
 Niklas Kronwall (1981-), defenseman, Detroit Red Wings
 Matīss Kivlenieks (1996-2021), goalie, played for the Columbus Blue Jackets, died from a fireworks accident
 Nicklas Lidström (1970-), captain, Detroit Red Wings, a Novi street is named in his honor
 Andreas Lilja (1975-), defenseman, Philadelphia Flyers
 Bryan Rust (1992-), winger, Pittsburgh Penguins
 Emily Samuelson (1990-), ice dancer, 2010 Olympian, 2009 U.S. silver medalist, and 2008 World Junior Champion
Paul Whelan (security director)
 Damien Woody (1977-), guard, New York Jets

Sister cities
 Owani, Japan

References

External links

City of Novi home page (Mobile)

On the name Novi in History of Oakland County Michigan a narrative account of its historic progress, its people, its principal interests / compiled from the official records of the county, the newspapers and data of personal interviews, under the editorial supervision of Thaddeus D. Seeley. (1912)
Founding of Novi in History of Oakland County, Michigan, Durant, Samuel W. 1877

 
Cities in Oakland County, Michigan
Metro Detroit
1832 establishments in Michigan Territory
Populated places established in 1832
Japanese-American culture in Michigan